Dairy Plains is a rural locality in the local government area (LGA) of Meander Valley in the Launceston LGA region of Tasmania. The 2016 census recorded a population of 69 for the state suburb of Dairy Plains.

History 
Dairy Plains was gazetted as a locality in 1968. 

It is an area that was part of the Van Diemen's Land Company holdings.

Geography
The boundaries are mostly survey lines, with small sections of minor watercourses in several places.

Road infrastructure 
Route C168 (Dairy Plains Road) runs through from north to south.

References

Towns in Tasmania
Localities of Meander Valley Council